Joaquín Susvielles (born 28 February 1991) is an Argentine professional footballer who plays as a forward for Belgrano.

Career
Atlético Santa Rosa were Susvielles' first club, which preceded the forward appearing for Alvear FC during the 2011–12 Torneo Argentino B season and playing thirteen times. Fellow fourth tier outfit Villa Mitre signed Susvielles in 2012. He remained for two years, scoring twenty-eight goals in fifty fixtures. On 30 June 2014, Susvielles joined Olimpo of the Argentine Primera División. He made his debut in a 1–1 tie with Racing Club on 25 October, which was the first of five appearances for Olimpo. Primera B Nacional's Guillermo Brown loaned Susvielles in 2015. Two goals in twenty-eight matches followed.

In January 2016, Susvielles completed a move to Ferro Carril Oeste (GP). He scored his first goals for them on 27 March 2016, notching a brace during a Torneo Federal A victory away to Alvarado. He scored two further goals, including another versus Alvarado and one against Unión Aconquija, in fifteen games as Ferro Carril Oeste were knockout out the play-offs by the aforementioned Unión Aconquija. Susvielles again departed Olimpo in July 2016, signing on loan for Alvarado in Torneo Federal A. He went on to score six goals across 2016–17, before being signed permanently for 2017–18 by Alvarado.

Susvielles joined Almagro on 30 June 2018. He scored on debut in a Copa Argentina win over Cipolletti, which preceded him netting Primera B Nacional goals against Deportivo Morón, Quilmes, Platense, Santamarina, Mitre (2) and Gimnasia y Esgrima. July 2019 saw Susvielles complete a move to Platense. He netted on his first home appearance versus Estudiantes on 25 August, on the way to a total of eight goals in two seasons with the club; including their promotion winning campaign of 2020. Susvielles wouldn't feature in the Primera División as he headed abroad to join Ecuadorian Serie A side Delfín. In January 2022, Susvielles joined Primera Nacional side Belgrano to fight for the club's promotion to the Liga Profesional de Fútbol.

Career statistics
.

References

External links

1991 births
Living people
People from Santa Rosa, La Pampa
Argentine footballers
Association football forwards
Argentine expatriate footballers
Expatriate footballers in Ecuador
Argentine expatriate sportspeople in Ecuador
Torneo Argentino B players
Argentine Primera División players
Primera Nacional players
Torneo Federal A players
Ecuadorian Serie A players
Atlético Santa Rosa players
Villa Mitre footballers
Olimpo footballers
Guillermo Brown footballers
Club Atlético Alvarado players
Club Almagro players
Club Atlético Platense footballers
Delfín S.C. footballers
Club Atlético Belgrano footballers